Thorns and Orange Blossoms is a 1922 American silent drama film directed by Louis J. Gasnier and starring Estelle Taylor, Kenneth Harlan, and Edith Roberts.

Plot
As described in a film magazine review, Alan Randolph and Spain's idol, singer Rosita Mendez, fall in love while Alan is visiting Spain. When reminded by a friend of his fiancée Violet Beaton back in Louisiana, he goes back. Rosita follows him by making an American tour. When they meet again, Alan, realizing the danger regarding Rosita, elopes with Violet and marries her at once in secret. Rosita, infuriated, threatens to kill him with a revolver and in a scuffle is wounded. Determined not to let anyone else have him, she has Alan sent to jail for five years. Rosita outlines a plan of escape to Alan, but he refuses. However, when he receives word from Violet of the birth of a baby, he accepts the plan and escapes, going back to his wife. Consumed with jealousy, Rosita informs on him and Alan is returned to jail, but, when she sees the baby, she relents and has him freed.

Cast

References

Bibliography
James Robert Parish & Michael R. Pitts. Film Directors: a Guide to their American Films. Scarecrow Press, 1974.

External links

1922 films
1922 drama films
1920s English-language films
American silent feature films
Silent American drama films
American black-and-white films
Films directed by Louis J. Gasnier
Preferred Pictures films
1920s American films